Swan Hill Airport  is located  south of Swan Hill, Victoria, Australia.

See also
 List of airports in Victoria

References

Airports in Victoria (Australia)
Swan Hill